Tiêu Lam Trường (born 14 October 1974), is a Vietnamese singer, considered one of the top singers of Vietnam in the late 1990s. He burst onto the scene in 1998 with a song titled "Tình Thôi Xót Xa" (trans. Love Stops Hurting) and has been a regular on the Top Ten Làn Sóng Xanh (a Vietnamese hit song program). He has also been in several movies and TV series. He is also an actor in a movie called "Ngôi Nhà Hạnh Phúc" (Vietnamese version of Korean drama "Full House").

Career
His song "Tình Thôi Xót Xa" (written by Bảo Chấn) become one of his signature song which received most request at the radio and his live show performances at the time. Besides that, he also have other significant songs: Cho Bạn Cho Tôi, Katy, Đôi Chân Thiên Thần...

In 2007, Lam Trường represented for Vietnam to embark the 2007 Asia Song Festival held in South Korea, which also features F4, Super Junior, and Zhao Wei in that year.

He also serves as coach in The Voice Kids (Vietnamese version).

Music 
October 1995, he was a runner-up of Thập Đại Tinh Tú singing contest for Vietnamese-Chinese community in Ho Chi Minh City.

In 1997, his debut album Baby I Love You was released, besides he also released many impressive cover songs from foreign songs.

In 1998, he became a sensation with hit song Tình Thôi Xót Xa (composed by Bao Chan). Following Tôi Ngàn Năm Đợi, Mưa Phi Trường,...For such a long time, he kept being featured in Top 10 Green Wave Music Chart of Ho Chi Minh City's Television.

In 2000, his first liveshow Lời Trái Tim Muốn Nói and album Chút Tình Ngây Thơ were successful. In 2002, he held second liveshow Cho Bạn Cho Tôi and released the single Cho Bạn Cho Tôi which was composed by himself after the first song Có Một Ngày back in 2001.

In September 2002, Japan's NHK channel invited him to perform in Japan after he'd won Green Wave Award.

In 2003, he continued to release albums Đêm Lạnh and Dù Ta Không Còn Yêu.

On 24 March 2007, Truong made another liveshow Chuyện Hôm Qua at Military Base 7 Stadium, Ho Chi Minh City.

In 2007, Truong is Vietnam's representative for Asia Song Festival in Korea.

Film 
Besides singing, he also starred in several films such as: Nữ Tướng Cướp, Ngôi Nhà Hạnh Phúc (Vietnam's remake from famous Korean drama), and Bếp Hát, in which he starred as the leading role.

Personal life 
In 2004, he married Ngo Y An, a Vietnamese-American lived in Houston, Texas who is a computer engineer. They have one son named Tieu Kien Van. However, they divorced in 2009 and his son is currently living with his ex wife.

In 2013, he remarried Yen Phuong – a student of Green River College, Auburn, Washington, USA who is 17-year younger than he is. In 2014, they officially became husband and wife, apparently he is back and forth between USA and Vietnam. Their daughter was born in 2017 and named Tieu Yen Lam.

Discography

Albums
 Baby, I Love You (1997)
 Tình Thôi Xót Xa (1998)
 Có Một Ngày (2001)
 Dù Ta Không Còn Yêu (2003)
 Đôi Giày Vải (2006)
 Chuyện Hôm Qua (2007)

Songs
 Tình Thôi Xót Xa
 Mưa Phi Trường
 Nơi Ấy Bình Yên
 Gót Hồng
 Dù Ta Không Còn Yêu
 Cho Bạn Cho Tôi
 Đôi Chân Thiên Thần
 Katy

Filmography
 Nữ Tướng Cướp (Movie) (2004)
 Ngôi Nhà Hạnh Phúc (TV Mini-Series) (2009)
 Bếp Hát (TV Series) (2013)
 Hidden Voices (TV series) (2017)

References

External links
 

Living people
20th-century Vietnamese male singers
1974 births
Walt Disney Records artists
Hoa people
People from Ho Chi Minh City
Vietnamese pop singers
21st-century Vietnamese male singers